This is a list of VTV dramas released in 2000.

←1999 - 2000 - 2001→

VTV New Year dramas
This film airs from 07:25 a.m to 08:45 a.m on VTV1 to celebrate new year and new decade. Followed by the special program Happy New Year 2000.

VTV Tet dramas
These films were released on VTV channels during Tet holiday.

VTV1 Friday night dramas
These dramas air on every Friday night around 21:00 on VTV1.

For The First Time On VTV3 Screen dramas
These dramas were aired under the name of the program For The First Time On VTV3 Screen (Vietnamese: Lần đầu tiên trên màn ảnh VTV3).

Until the end of April, the program followed the schedule since late 1999 which it airs on every Saturday afternoon.

Since May, the program was moved to every Tuesday night time slot after the 19:00 News Report (aired later or delayed in occasions of special events).

VTV3 Cinema For Saturday Afternoon dramas
New time slot was established this year as a collaboration of VTV and Vietnam Cinema Department, with the aim of creating a playground for feature filmmakers. It aired each two weeks during August and September (as a demo) and weekly since October.

These films air in Saturday afternoon on VTV3 with the duration approximately 70 minutes as a part of the program Cinema for Saturday afternoon (Vietnamese: Điện ảnh chiều thứ Bảy). They were produced by filmmakers in Cinema For Saturday Afternoon Club and several partner film studios.

VTV3 Sunday Literature & Art dramas
These dramas air in early Sunday afternoon on VTV3 as a part of the program Sunday Literature & Art (Vietnamese: Văn nghệ Chủ Nhật).

Note: The time slot was delayed on 6 Feb due to the broadcast schedule for Tết programs.

See also
 List of dramas broadcast by Vietnam Television (VTV)
 List of dramas broadcast by Hanoi Radio Television (HanoiTV)
 List of dramas broadcast by Vietnam Digital Television (VTC)

References

External links
VTV.gov.vn – Official VTV Website 
VTV.vn – Official VTV Online Newspaper 

Vietnam Television original programming
2000 in Vietnamese television